Jacques Andre Emile Sanglier (22 February 1919 – 3 March 2014) was a French politician and tennis player.

A native of Paris, Sanglier was active on the tennis tour from the 1930s to 1950s. He made the singles fourth round at the 1946 Wimbledon Championships, before being beaten by Lennart Bergelin.

Sanglier was a member of Gaullist political parties and was first elected deputy in 1959. He replaced Pierre-Christian Taittinger as a Senator of Paris in 1976 and served the final two years of his term.

References

External links
 

1919 births
2014 deaths
French male tennis players
Senators of Paris
Members of Parliament for Paris
Rally for the Republic politicians
Union of Democrats for the Republic politicians
Union for the New Republic politicians
Tennis players from Paris
People from Bois-Colombes
French sportsperson-politicians